This is a list of all songs recorded by Status Quo.

Lineups

Francis Rossi / Rick Parfitt / Alan Lancaster / John Coghlan / Roy Lynes (1968-1970)
 "Antique Angelique" - Lancaster/B. Young, 1969 (Spare Parts)
 "(April) Spring, Summer and Wednesdays" - Rossi/ B. Young, 1970 (Ma Kelly's Greasy Spoon)
 "Are You Growing Tired of My Love" - A. King, 1969 (Spare Parts)
 "Auntie Nellie" - Lancaster, 1969
 "Black Veils of Melancholy" - Rossi, 1968 (Picturesque Matchstickable Messages from the Status Quo)
 "Daughter" - Lancaster, 1969 (Ma Kelly's Greasy Spoon)
 "Down the Dustpipe" - Groszmann, 1970, re-recorded in 2002 (Riffs)
 "Elizabeth Dreams" - Wilde/Scott, 1968 (Picturesque Matchstickable Messages from the Status Quo)
 "Everything" - Rossi/Parfitt, 1970 (Ma Kelly's Greasy Spoon)
 "Face Without a Soul" - Rossi/Parfitt, 1969 (Spare Parts)
 "Gentleman Joe's Sidewalk Café" - K. Young, 1968 (Picturesque Matchstickable Messages from the Status Quo)
 "Gerdundula" - Manston/James, 1970
 "Green Tambourine" - Leka/Pinz, 1968 (Picturesque Matchstickable Messages from the Status Quo)
 "Ice in the Sun" - Wilde/Scott, 1968 (Picturesque Matchstickable Messages from the Status Quo)
 "In My Chair" - Rossi/B. Young, 1970
 "Is It Really Me / Gotta Go Home" - Lancaster, 1970 (Ma Kelly's Greasy Spoon)
 "Junior's Wailing" - White/Pugh, 1970 (Ma Kelly's Greasy Spoon), re-recorded in 2002 (Riffs)
 "Lakky Lady" - Rossi/Parfitt, 1970 (Ma Kelly's Greasy Spoon)
 "Lazy Poker Blues" - Green/Adams), 1970 (Ma Kelly's Greasy Spoon)
 "Little Miss Nothing" - Rossi/Parfitt, 1969 (Spare Parts)
 "Make Me Stay a Bit Longer" - Rossi/Parfitt, 1969
 "Mr. Mind Detector" - A. King, 1969 (Spare Parts)
 "Need Your Love" - Rossi/B. Young, 1970 (Ma Kelly's Greasy Spoon)
 "Nothing at All" - Lancaster/Lynes/B. Young, 1969 (Spare Parts)
 "Paradise Flat" - Wilde/Scott, 1968 (Picturesque Matchstickable Messages from the Status Quo)
 "Pictures of Matchstick Men" - Rossi, 1968 (Picturesque Matchstickable Messages from the Status Quo), re-recorded in 1999
 "Poor Old Man" - Rossi/Parfitt, 1969 (Spare Parts)
 "Sheila" - Roe, 1968 (Picturesque Matchstickable Messages from the Status Quo)
 "Shy Fly" - Rossi/B. Young, 1970 (Ma Kelly's Greasy Spoon)
 "So Ends Another Life" - Lancaster, 1969 (Spare Parts)
 "Spicks and Specks" - Gibb, 1968 (Picturesque Matchstickable Messages from the Status Quo)
 "Spinning Wheel Blues" - Rossi/B. Young, 1970 (Ma Kelly's Greasy Spoon)
 "Sunny Cellophane Skies" - Lancaster, 1968 (Picturesque Matchstickable Messages from the Status Quo)
 "Technicolour Dreams" - A. King, 1968 (Picturesque Matchstickable Messages from the Status Quo)
 "The Clown" - Lancaster/B. Young/Nixon, 1969 (Spare Parts)
 "The Price of Love" - D. Everly/P. Everly, 1969, re-recorded in 1991 (Rock 'Til You Drop)
 "To Be Free" - Lynes, 1968
 "When I Awake" - Lancaster/B. Young, 1969 (Spare Parts)
 "When My Mind Is Not Live" - Rossi/Parfitt, 1968 (Picturesque Matchstickable Messages from the Status Quo)
 "You're Just What I Was Looking For Today" - C. King/Goffin, 1969 (Spare Parts)

Francis Rossi / Rick Parfitt / Alan Lancaster / John Coghlan (1971-1972)
 "A Year" - Lancaster/Frost, 1972 (Piledriver)
 "All the Reasons" - Parfitt/Lancaster, 1972 (Piledriver)
 "Big Fat Mama" - Rossi/Parfitt, 1972 (Piledriver)
 "Don't Waste My Time" - Rossi/Young, 1972 (Piledriver), re-recorded in 1998 ("In the Army Now" CD single)
 "Gerdundula" - Manston/James, 1971 (Dog of Two Head)
 "Good Thinking" - Rossi/Parfitt/Lancaster/Young, 1971
 "Mean Girl" - Rossi/Young, 1971 (Dog of Two Head)
 "Nanana (Extraction I)" - Rossi/Young, 1971 (Dog of Two Head)
 "Nanana (Extraction II)" - Rossi/Young, 1971 (Dog of Two Head)
 "Nanana" - Rossi/Young, 1971 (Dog of Two Head)
 "Oh Baby" - Rossi/Parfitt, 1972 (Piledriver)
 "Paper Plane - Rossi/Young, 1972 (Piledriver)
 "Railroad" - Rossi/Young, 1971 (Dog of Two Head)
 "Roadhouse Blues" - Morrison/Densmore/Manzarek/Krieger, 1972 (Piledriver)
 "Softer Ride" - Parfitt/Lancaster, 1972, re-recorded in 2022 (Quoin' In - The Best of the Noughties)
 "Someone's Learning" - Lancaster, 1971 (Dog of Two Head)
 "Something Going on in My Head" - Lancaster, 1971 (Dog of Two Head)
 "Tune to the Music" - Rossi/Young, 1971
 "Umleitung" - Lancaster/Lynes, 1971 (Dog of Two Head)
 "Unspoken Words" - Rossi/Young, 1972 (Piledriver)

Francis Rossi / Rick Parfitt / Alan Lancaster / John Coghlan / Andy Bown (1973-1981)
 "A B Blues" - Rossi/Parfitt/Lancaster/Coghlan/Bown, 1980
 "A Planet called Monday" - Beckerman/Malone, 1977 (Album - Intergalactic Touring Band, only Rossi & Parfitt on vocals)
 "A Reason for Living" - Rossi/Parfitt, 1973 (Hello!)
 "Accident Prone" - Williams/Hutchins, 1978 (If You Can't Stand the Heat)
 "Again and Again" - Parfitt/Bown/Lynton, 1978 (If You Can't Stand the Heat)
 "And It's Better Now" - Rossi/Young, 1973 (Hello!)
 "All Through the Night" - Rossi/Lancaster, 1976
 "Baby Boy" - Rossi/Young, 1977 (Rockin' All Over the World)
 "Backwater" - Parfitt/Lancaster, 1974 (Quo)
 "Bad Company" - Williams/Hutchins, 1979 (Outtake from Whatever You Want sessions)
 "Blue Eyed Lady"  - Parfitt/Lancaster, 1973 (Hello!)
 "Blue for You" - Lancaster, 1976 (Blue for You)
 "Break the Rules" - Rossi/Parfitt/Lancaster/Coghlan/Young, 1974 (Quo)
 "Breaking Away" - Rossi/Parfitt/Bown, 1979 (Whatever You Want)
 "Broken Man" - Lancaster, 1975 (On the Level)
 "Bye Bye Johnny" - Berry, 1975 (On the Level)
 "Can't Give You More" - Rossi/Young, 1977 (Rockin' All Over the World), re-recorded in 1991 (Rock 'Til You Drop)
 "Carol" - Berry, 1981 (Never Too Late)
 "Caroline" - Rossi/Young, 1973 (Hello!), re-recorded in 2002 (Riffs), re-recorded in 2022 (Quoin' In - The Best of the Noughties)
 "Claudie" - Rossi/Young, 1973 (Hello!)
 "Come Rock With Me/Rockin' On" - Rossi/Frost, 1979 (Whatever You Want)
 "Coming and Going" - Parfitt/Young, 1980 (Just Supposin')
 "Dirty Water" - Rossi/Young, 1977 (Rockin' All Over the World)
 "Don't Drive My Car" - Parfitt/Bown, 1980 (Just Supposin')
 "Don't Stop Me Now" - Lancaster/Bown, 1981 (Never Too Late)
 "Don't Think It Matters" - Parfitt/Lancaster, 1974 (Quo)
 "Down Down" - Rossi/Young, 1975 (On the Level)
 "Drifting Away" - Parfitt/Lancaster, 1974 (Quo)
 "Ease Your Mind" - Lancaster, 1976 (Blue for You)
 "Enough is Enough" - Rossi/Frost, 1981 (Never Too Late)
 "Falling In Falling Out" - Parfitt/Bown/Young, 1981 (Never Too Late)
 "Fine Fine Fine" - Rossi/Young, 1974 (Quo)
 "For You" - Parfitt, 1977 (Rockin' All Over the World)
 "Forty Five Hundred Times" - Rossi/Parfitt, 1973 (Hello!), re-recorded in 1991 (Rock 'Til You Drop)
 "Getting Better" - Lennon–McCartney, 1976 (All This and World War II, film soundtrack with various artists)
 "Gonna Teach You to Love Me" - Lancaster/Green, 1978 (If You Can't Stand the Heat)
 "Hard Ride" - Lancaster/Green, 1979
 "Hard Time" - Rossi/Parfitt, 1977 (Rockin' All Over the World)
 "High Flyer" - Lancaster/Young, 1979 (Whatever You Want)
 "Hold You Back" - Rossi/Parfitt/Young, 1977 (Rockin' All Over the World)
 "I Saw the Light" - Rossi/Young, 1975 (On the Level)
 "I'm Giving Up My Worryin'" - Rossi/Frost, 1978 (If You Can't Stand the Heat)
 "Is There a Better Way" - Rossi/Lancaster, 1976 (Blue for You)
 "Joanne" - Lancaster, 1973
 "Just Take Me" - Parfitt/Lancaster, 1974 (Quo)
 "Let Me Fly" - Rossi/Young, 1978 (If You Can't Stand the Heat)
 "Let's Ride" - Lancaster, 1977 (Rockin' All Over the World)
 "Lies" - Rossi/Frost, 1980 (Just Supposin')
 "Like a Good Girl" - Rossi/Frost, 1978 (If You Can't Stand the Heat)
 "Little Lady" - Parfitt, 1975 (On the Level)
 "Living on an Island" - Parfitt/Young, 1979 (Whatever You Want), re-recorded in 2013
 "Long Ago" - Rossi/Frost, 1981 (Never Too Late)
 "Lonely Man" - Parfitt/Lancaster, 1974 (Quo)
 "Lonely Night" - Rossi/Parfitt/Lancaster/Coghlan/Young, 1974
 "Long Legged Linda" - Bown, 1978 (If You Can't Stand the Heat)
 "Mad About the Boy" - Rossi/Young, 1976 (Blue for You)
 "Most of the Time" - Rossi/Young, 1975 (On the Level)
 "Mountain Lady" - Lancaster, 1981 (Never Too Late)
 "Mystery Song" - Parfitt/Young, 1976 (Blue for You)
 "Name of the Game" - Rossi/Lancaster/Bown, 1980 (Just Supposin')
 "Never Too Late" - Rossi/Frost, 1981 (Never Too Late)
 "Nightride" - Parfitt/Young, 1975 (On the Level)
 "Oh, What a Night" - Parfitt/Bown, 1978 (If You Can't Stand the Heat)
 "Over and Done" - Lancaster, 1975 (On the Level)
 "Over the Edge" - Lancaster/Lamb, 1980 (Just Supposin')
 "Rain" - Parfitt, 1976 (Blue for You)
 "Ring of a Change" - Rossi/Young, 1976 (Blue for You)
 "Riverside" - Rossi/Frost, 1981 (Never Too Late)
 "Rock 'n' Roll" - Rossi/Frost, 1980 (Just Supposin')
 "Rockers Rollin'" - Parfitt/Lynton, 1977 (Rockin' All Over the World)
 "Rockin' All Over the World" - Fogerty, 1977 (Rockin' All Over the World) - re-recorded in 1988 as "Running All Over the World", re-recorded in 2002 (Riffs), partially re-recorded in 2022 (Quoin' In - The Best of the Noughties)
 "Roll Over Lay Down" - Rossi/Parfitt/Lancaster/Coghlan/Young, 1973 (Hello!)
 "Rolling Home" - Rossi/Lancaster, 1976 (Blue for You)
 "Run to Mummy" - Rossi/Bown, 1980 (Just Supposin')
 "Shady Lady" - Rossi/Young, 1979 (Whatever You Want)
 "Slow Train" - Rossi/Young, 1974 (Quo)
 "Softer Ride" - Parfitt/Lancaster, 1973 (Hello!)
 "Someone Show Me Home" - Rossi/Frost, 1978 (If You Can't Stand the Heat)
 "Something 'Bout You Baby I Like" - Supa, 1981 (Never Too Late)
 "Stones" - Lancaster, 1978 (If You Can't Stand the Heat)
 "Take Me Away" - Parfitt/Bown, 1981 (Never Too Late)
 "That's a Fact" - Rossi/Young, 1976 (Blue for You)
 "The Wild Ones" - Lancaster, 1980 (Just Supposin')
 "Too Far Gone" - Lancaster, 1977 (Rockin' All Over the World)
 "What to Do" - Rossi/Young, 1975 (On the Level)
 "What You're Proposing" - Rossi/Frost, 1980 (Just Supposin')
 "Whatever You Want" - Parfitt/Bown, 1979 (Whatever You Want), re-recorded in 1997 ("In the Army Now" CD single), re-recorded in 2002 (Riffs)
 "Where I Am" - Parfitt, 1975 (On the Level)
 "Who Am I" - Williams/Hutchins, 1977 (Rockin' All Over the World)
 "Who Asked You" - Lancaster, 1979 (Whatever You Want)
 "Wild Side of Life" - Carter/Warren, 1976
 "You Don't Own Me" - Lancaster/Green, 1977 (Rockin' All Over the World)
 "You Lost the Love" - Rossi/Young, 1976
 "Your Smiling Face" - Parfitt/Bown, 1979 (Whatever You Want)

Francis Rossi / Rick Parfitt / Alan Lancaster / Andy Bown / Pete Kircher (1982-1983; 1985)

 "A Mess of Blues" (Doc Pomus, Mort Shuman) (1983, Back To Back)
 "Big Man" (Lancaster, Mick Green), 1982 (1+9+8+2 album)
 "Cadillac Ranch" (Bruce Springsteen) (1984 out-take from The Wanderer sessions)
 "Calling the Shots" (Parfitt, Bown) (early 1982, Andy Bown on vocals; B-side of "Jealousy", released as a single in some European countries)
 "Can't Be Done" (Francis Rossi, Bernie Frost) (1983, Back To Back)
 "Dear John" (John Gustafson, Jackie Macauley), 1982 (1+9+8+2 album)
 "Doesn't Matter" (Rossi, Frost), 1982 (1+9+8+2 album)
 "Get Out and Walk" (Parfitt, Bown), 1982 (1+9+8+2 album)
 "God Save The Queen" (trad. arr Rossi/Parfitt/Lancaster/Bown/Kircher; pre-recorded by Quo and played as the introduction at their concert at the Birmingham NEC on 14/5/82) 
 "Going Down Town Tonight" (Guy Johnson) (1983, Back To Back, allegedly featuring only Rossi/Frost) - re-recorded version released as a 1984 single
 "I Love Rock and Roll" (Alan Lancaster), 1982 (1+9+8+2 album)
 "I Should Have Known" (Rossi, Frost), 1982 (1+9+8+2 album)
 "I Want the World to Know" (Lancaster, Keith Lamb), 1982 (1+9+8+2 album)
 "I Wonder Why" (Rossi, Frost) (Quo version dates from 1983 Back To Back sessions, re-recorded by Rossi/Frost in 1985 featuring Bown and Kircher)
 "Jealousy" (Rossi, Frost), 1982 (1+9+8+2 album, allegedly featuring only Rossi and Frost while a band recording remains unreleased); re-recorded in 1985 by Rossi/Frost featuring Bown and Kircher
 "Marguerita Time" (Rossi, Frost) (1983, Back To Back); (re-recorded version with Bown on bass played once only on Cannon And Ball TV show in early 1984)
 "No Contract" (Parfitt, Bown) (1983, Back To Back)
 "Ol' Rag Blues" (Alan Lancaster, Keith Lamb) (1983, Back To Back); (alternate version with Lancaster on lead vocal unreleased until Back To Back 2006 reissue)
 "Resurrection" (Bown, Parfitt), 1982 (1+9+8+2 album)
 "She Don't Fool Me" (Rick Parfitt, Andy Bown), 1982 (1+9+8+2 album)
 "Stay the Night" (Rossi, Frost, Andrew Miller) (1983, Back To Back)
 "That's All Right" (Rossi, Frost), 1985 (featuring Bown, Kircher and Rossi)
 "The Wanderer" (Ernie Maresca) (1984 single)
 "Too Close to the Ground" (Rick Parfitt, Andy Bown) (1983, Back To Back)
 "Win or Lose" (Rossi, Frost) (1983, Back To Back)
 "Young Pretender" (Francis Rossi, Bernie Frost), 1982 (1+9+8+2 album)
 "Your Kind of Love" (Lancaster) (1983, Back To Back)

Francis Rossi / Rick Parfitt / Andy Bown / John Edwards / Jeff Rich (1986-2001)

 "1000 Years" - Rossi/Frost, 1989 (Perfect Remedy)
 "Ain't Complaining" - Parfitt/Williams, 1988 (Ain't Complaining)
 "Address Book" - Rossi/Frost, 1989 (Perfect Remedy)
 "All Around My Hat" (feat. Maddy Prior) - Traditional arranged by Rossi/Parfitt/Bown/Edwards/Rich, 1996 (Don't Stop)
 "All We Really Wanna Do (Polly)" - Rossi/Frost, 1991 (Rock 'Til You Drop)
 "Analyse Time" - Rossi/Bown, 1999
 "And I Do" - Rossi/Bown/McAnaney, 1994
 "Another Shipwreck" - Bown, 1988 (Ain't Complaining) (originally released as a solo single by Bown in 1978)
 "Beautiful" - Rossi/Bown, 1994
 "Better Times" - Rossi/Frost, 1991
 "Blessed Are the Meek" - Rossi/Frost, 1999 (Under the Influence)
 "Bring It On Home" - Sam Cooke, 1991 (Rock 'Til You Drop)
 "Burning Bridges" - Rossi/Bown, 1988 (Ain't Complaining)
 "Calling" - Rossi/Frost, 1986 (In the Army Now)
 "Ciao-Ciao" - Rossi/Bown, 1994 (Thirsty Work)
 "Claudette" - Orbison, 2000 (Famous in the Last Century)
 "Confidence" - Bown, 1994 (Thirsty Work)
 "Crawling from the Wreckage" - Parker
 "Cream of the Crop" - Rossi/Frost, 1988 (Ain't Complaining)
 "Cross That Bridge" - John David, 1988 (Ain't Complaining)
 "Dead in the Water" - Rossi/Bown, 1991
 "Democracy" - Leonard Cohen, 1994
 "Doing It All for You" - Parfitt/Williams, 1989
 "Don't Mind If I Do" - Rossi/Edwards, 1988 (Ain't Complaining)
 "Don't Stop" - Christine McVie, 1996 (Don't Stop)
 "Down To You" - Rossi/Bown, 1994
 "Dreamin'" (aka "Naughty Girl") - Rossi/Frost, 1986 (In the Army Now) ("Naughty Girl" scheduled for release in 1985 but ultimately unreleased)
 "Driving to Glory" - Parfitt/Edwards, 1999
 "End of the Line" - Parfitt/Patrick, 1986 (In the Army Now)
 "Everytime I Think of You" - Edwards/Rich/Paxman, 1988 (Ain't Complaining)
 "Fakin' the Blues" - Rossi/Frost, 1991 (Rock 'Til You Drop)
 "Fame or Money" - Rossi/Bown, 1991 (Rock 'Til You Drop)
 "Famous in the Last Century" - Bown, 2000 (Famous in the Last Century)
 "Fighting With the Pack" - Rossi/Frost/Parfitt, 1999
 "Fun, Fun, Fun" (feat. The Beach Boys) - Wilson/Love, 1996 (Don't Stop)
 "Get Back" - Lennon/McCartney, 1996 (Don't Stop)
 "Get Out of Denver" - Seger, 1996 (Don't Stop)
 "Goin' Nowhere" - Rossi/Frost/McAnaney, 1994 (Thirsty Work)
 "Going Down for the First Time" - Bown/Edwards, 1989 (Perfect Remedy)
 "Good Golly Miss Molly" - Blackwell/Marascalco, 2000 (Famous in the Last Century)
 "Good Sign" - Parfitt/Williams, 1991 (Rock 'Til You Drop)
 "Gone Thru the Slips" - Bown, 1989
 "Heart on Hold" - Bown/Palmer, 1989 (Perfect Remedy)
 "Heartburn" - Parfitt/Patrick/Rossi, 1986
 "Heavy Daze" - Parfitt/Williams, 1991
 "Hound Dog" - Leiber/Stoller, 2000 (Famous in the Last Century)
 "I Didn't Mean It" - John David, 1994 (Thirsty Work)
 "I Can Hear the Grass Grow" - Roy Wood, 1996 (Don't Stop)
 "I Knew the Bride" - Lowe, 1999
 "I Know You're Leaving" - Van Tijn/Fluitsma, 1988 (Ain't Complaining)
 "I'll Never Get Over You" - Mills, 1996
 "In the Army Now" - Bolland/Bolland, 1986 (In the Army Now), re-recorded as In the Army Now 2010
 "In Your Eyes" - Rossi/Frost, 1986 (In the Army Now)
 "Invitation" - Rossi/Young, 1986 (In the Army Now) (originally demoed in 1978)
 "Johnny and Mary" - Palmer, 1996 (Don't Stop)
 "Keep 'em Coming" - Bown, 1999 (Under the Influence)
 "Keep Me Guessing" - Parfitt/Rossi/Young, 1986 (originally demoed in 1978)
 "Lean Machine" - Rossi/Parfitt, 1988
 "Let's Work Together" - Wilbert Harrison, 1991 (Rock 'Til You Drop)
 "Like a Zombie" - Rossi/Frost, 1991 (Rock 'Til You Drop)
 "Like It Or Not" - Rossi/Frost, 1994 (Thirsty Work)
 "Little Dreamer" - Rossi/Frost, 1989 (Perfect Remedy)
 "Little Me and You" - Bown, 1999 (Under the Influence)
 "Little White Lies" - Parfitt, 1999 (Under the Influence)
 "Lonely" - Parfitt/Rossi, 1986
 "Lover of the Human Race" - Rossi/Bown, 1994 (Thirsty Work)
 "Lucille" - Penniman/Collins, 1996 (Don't Stop)
 "Magic" - Rossi/Frost, 1988 (Ain't Complaining)
 "Making Waves" - Rossi/Frost, 1999 (Under the Influence)
 "Man Overboard" - Parfitt/Williams, 1989 (Perfect Remedy)
 "Memphis, Tennessee" - Berry, 2000 (Famous in the Last Century)
 "Mony Mony" - Bloom/Gentry/James/Cordell, 2000 (Famous in the Last Century)
 "Mortified" - Rossi/Parfitt/Bown/Edwards/Rich, 1996
 "Mysteries from the Ball" - Rossi/Parfitt, 1991
 "No Problems" - Rossi/Parfitt, 1991 (Rock 'Til You Drop)
 "Not At All" - Rossi/Frost, 1989 (Perfect Remedy)
 "Not Fade Away" - Petty/Hardin, 1999 (Under the Influence)
 "Nothing Comes Easy" - Rossi/Parfitt/Bown/Edwards/Rich, 1991 (Rock 'Til You Drop)
 "Obstruction Day" - Parfitt/Edwards, 1999
 "Old Time Rock and Roll" - Jackson/Jones, 2000 (Famous in the Last Century)
 "One for the Money" - Parfitt/Williams, 1988 (Ain't Complaining)
 "One Man Band" - Parfitt/Williams, 1991 (Rock 'Til You Drop)
 "Once Bitten Twice Shy" - Hunter, 2000 (Famous in the Last Century)
 "Overdose" - Parfitt/Williams, 1986 (In the Army Now)
 "Perfect Remedy" - Rossi/Frost, 1989 (Perfect Remedy)
 "Point of No Return" - Bown/Edwards, 1994 (Thirsty Work)
 "Proud Mary" - Fogerty, 1996 (Don't Stop)
 "Queenie" - Rossi/Frost, 1994 (Thirsty Work)
 "Raining In My Heart" (feat. Brian May) - Bryant/Byrant, 1996 (Don't Stop)
 "Rave On" - Petty/Tilghman/West, 2000 (Famous in the Last Century)
 "Red Sky" - John David, 1986 (In the Army Now)
 "Restless" - Jennifer Warnes, 1994 (Thirsty Work)
 "Rock 'n' Roll Floorboards" - Brian Alterman, 1986
 "Rock'n Me" - Miller, 2000 (Famous in the Last Century)
 "Rock 'Til You Drop" - Bown, 1991 (Rock 'Til You Drop)
 "Roll Over Beethoven" - Berry, 2000 (Famous in the Last Century)
 "Roll the Dice" - Rossi/Frost, 1999 (Under the Influence)
 "Rollin' Home" - John David, 1986 (In the Army Now)
 "Rotten to the Bone" - Rossi/Bown, 1989
 "Round and Round" - Bown/Edwards, 1999 (Under the Influence)
 "Rude Awakening Time" - Rossi/Frost, 1994 (Thirsty Work)
 "Runaround Sue" - DiMucci/Maresca, 2000 (Famous in the Last Century)
 "Sail Away" - Rossi/Frost, 1994 (Thirsty Work)
 "Save Me" - Rossi/Parfitt, 1986 (In the Army Now)
 "Sea Cruise" - Huey "Piano" Smith, 1999
 "She Knew Too Much" - Rossi/Bown, 1994
 "Sherri, Don't Fail Me Now!" - Bown/Edwards, 1994 (Thirsty Work)
 "Shine On" - Parfitt/Edwards, 1999 (Under the Influence)
 "Soft in the Head" - Rossi/Frost, 1994 (Thirsty Work)
 "Sorrow" - Feldman, Goldstein, Gottehrer, 1996 (Don't Stop)
 "Sorry" - Rossi/Frost, 1994 (Thirsty Work) (originally released by Demis Roussos in 1980 on his album Man of the World)
 "Speechless" - Ian Hunter, 1986 (In the Army Now)
 "Survival" - Rossi/Bown, 1994
 "Sweet Home Chicago" - Robert Johnson, 2000 (Famous in the Last Century)
 "Tango" - Rossi/Frost, 1994 (Thirsty Work)
 "Temporary Friend" - Rossi/Parfitt/Bown/Edwards/Rich, 1996
 "That's Alright" - Rossi/Frost, 1988 (originally a duo track from 1985)
 "The Anniversary Waltz" - various writers, 1990
 "The Future's So Bright (I Gotta Wear Shades)" - MacDonald, 1996 (Don't Stop)
 "The Greatest Fighter" (aka "The Fighter") - Rossi/Frost, 1988 (later re-recorded for King of the Doghouse)
 "The Loving Game" - Parfitt/Edwards/Rich, 1988 (Ain't Complaining)
 "The Power of Rock" - Parfitt/Williams/Rossi, 1989 (Perfect Remedy)
 "The Reason for Goodbye" - Williams/Goodison/Parfitt/Rossi, 1988
 "The Safety Dance" - Doroschuk, 1996 (Don't Stop)
 "The Way I Am" - Edwards/Rich/Paxman, 1989 (Perfect Remedy)
 "The Way It Goes" - Rossi/Frost, 1999 (Under the Influence)
 "Throw Her a Line" - Rossi/Frost , 1989 (Perfect Remedy)
 "Tilting at the Mill" - Rossi/Parfitt/Bown/Edwards/Rich, 1996
 "Tommy's in Love" (aka "Tommy") - Rossi/Frost, 1989 (Perfect Remedy), re-recorded in 1991 (Rock 'Til You Drop)
 "Tossin' and Turnin'" - Rossi/Frost, 1994
 "Twenty Wild Horses" - Rossi/Frost, 1999 (Under the Influence)
 "Under the Influence" - Rossi/Frost, 1999 (Under the Influence)
 "Warning Shot" - Bown/Edwards, 1991 (Rock 'Til You Drop)
 "Way Down" - Martine, 2000 (Famous in the Last Century)
 "When I'm Dead and Gone" - Gallagher/Lyle, 2000 (Famous in the Last Century)
 "When You Walk in the Room" - DeShannon, 1996 (Don't Stop)
 "Who Gets the Love?" - Williams/Goodison, 1988 (Ain't Complaining)
 "You Never Can Tell" - Berry, 1996 (Don't Stop)

Francis Rossi / Rick Parfitt / Andy Bown / John Edwards / Matt Letley (2002-2013)

 "Alright" - Parfitt/Morris, 2007 (In Search Of The Fourth Chord)
 "All Day And All Of The Night" - Davies, 2003 (Riffs)
 "All Stand Up (Never Say Never)" - Rossi/Young, 2002 (Heavy Traffic)
 "All That Counts Is Love" - John David, 2005 (The Party Ain't Over Yet)
 "All That Money" - Parfitt/Morris, 2013 (Bula Quo!)
 "Another Day" - Rossi/Young, 2002 (Heavy Traffic)
 "Any Way You Like It" - Bown/Crook/Edwards, 2011 (Quid Pro Quo)
 "Bad News" - Edwards, 2007 (In Search Of The Fourth Chord)
 "Beginning Of The End" - Rossi/Edwards, 2007 (In Search Of The Fourth Chord)
 "Belavista Man" - Parfitt/Edwards, 2005 (The Party Ain't Over Yet)
 "Better Than That" - Rossi/Young, 2011 (Quid Pro Quo)
 "Blues and Rhythm" - Rossi/Bown, 2002 (Heavy Traffic)
 "Born To Be Wild" - Bonfire, 2003 (Riffs)
 "Bula Bula Quo (Kua Ni Lega)" - Rossi/Young, 2013 (Bula Quo!)
 "Can't See For Looking" - Parfitt/Bown/Edwards, 2011 (Quid Pro Quo)
 "Centerfold" - Justman, 2003 (Riffs)
 "Creepin' Up On You" - Parfitt/Edwards, 2002 (Heavy Traffic)
 "Cupid Stupid" - Rossi/Young, 2005 (The Party Ain't Over Yet)
 "Diggin' Burt Bacharach" - Rossi/Young, 2002 (Heavy Traffic)
 "Do It Again" - Edwards/Bown, 2002 (Heavy Traffic)
 "Don't Bring Me Down" - Lynne, 2003 (Riffs)
 "Dust To Gold" - Rossi/Bown/Edwards, 2011 (Quid Pro Quo)
 "Electric Arena" - Rossi/Young, 2007 (In Search Of The Fourth Chord)
 "Familiar Blues" - Parfitt/Bown, 2005 (The Party Ain't Over Yet)
 "Figure Of Eight" - Bown, 2007 (In Search Of The Fourth Chord)
 "Fiji Time" - Edwards, 2013 (Bula Quo!)
 "Frozen Hero" - Rossi/Bown, 2011 (Quid Pro Quo)
 "GoGoGo" - Parfitt/Morris, 2013 (Bula Quo!)
 "Goodbye Baby" - Rossi/Young, 2005 (The Party Ain't Over Yet)
 "Gotta Get Up And Go" - Rossi/Young, 2005 (The Party Ain't Over Yet)
 "Gravy Train" - Edwards, 2007 (In Search Of The Fourth Chord)
 "Green" - Bown, 2002 (Heavy Traffic)
 "Heavy Traffic" - Rossi/Young/Edwards, 2002 (Heavy Traffic)
 "Hold Me" - Parfitt/Morris, 2007 (In Search Of The Fourth Chord)
 "I Ain't Ready" - Rossi/Young, 2005
 "I Ain't Wasting My Time" - Rossi/Young, 2007 (In Search Of The Fourth Chord)
 "I Don't Remember Anymore" - Bown, 2002 (Heavy Traffic)
 "I Don't Wanna Hurt You Anymore" - Rossi/Young, 2007 (In Search Of The Fourth Chord)
 "I Fought The Law" - Curtis, 2003 (Riffs)
 "I'm Watching Over You" - Rossi/Young, 2005
 "It's All About You" - Rossi/Young, 2011 (Quid Pro Quo)
 "It's Christmas Time" - Parfitt/Morris, 2008 (Pictures - 40 Years Of Hits)
 "Jam Side Down" - Britten/Dore, 2002 (Heavy Traffic)
 "Kick Me When I'm Down" - David/Wilder, 2005 (The Party Ain't Over Yet)
 "Leave A Little Light On" - Parfitt/Morris, 2011 (Quid Pro Quo)
 "Let's Rock" - Parfitt/Morris, 2011 (Quid Pro Quo)
 "Looking Out for Caroline" - Parfitt/Young, 2013 (Bula Quo!)
 "Lucinda" - Parfitt/Edwards, 2004
 "Money Don't Matter" - Rossi/Young, 2002 (Heavy Traffic)
 "Movin' On" - Rossi/Young, 2011 (Quid Pro Quo)
 "My Little Heartbreaker" - Rossi/Young, 2007 (In Search Of The Fourth Chord)
 "My Old Ways" - Rossi/Young, 2011 (Quid Pro Quo)
 "Mystery Island" - Parfitt/Morris, 2013 (Bula Quo!)
 "Nevashooda" - Bown/Letley, 2005 (The Party Ain't Over Yet)
 "Never Leave a Friend Behind" - Bown/St. Paul, 2013 (Bula Quo!)
 "On The Road Again" - Jones/Wilson, 2003 (Riffs)
 "One by One" - Parfitt/Young, 2007, originally demoed in 1978
 "Pennsylvania Blues Tonight" - Rossi/Young, 2007 (In Search Of The Fourth Chord)
 "Pump It Up" - Costello, 2003 (Riffs)
 "Reality Cheque" - Parfitt/Edwards, 2011 (Quid Pro Quo)
 "Rhythm of Life" - Rossi/Young, 2002 (Heavy Traffic)
 "Rock n Roll n You" - Rossi/Bown, 2011 (Quid Pro Quo)
 "Run and Hide (The Gun Song)" - Edwards/St. Paul, 2013 (Bula Quo!)
 "Running Inside My Head" - Letley, 2013 (Bula Quo!)
 "Saddling Up" - Rossi/Bown, 2007 (In Search Of The Fourth Chord)
 "Solid Gold" - Rossi/Young, 2002 (Heavy Traffic)
 "Takin' Care Of Business" - Bachman, 2003 (Riffs)
 "The Bubble" - Bown/Edwards, 2005 (The Party Ain't Over Yet)
 "The Madness" - Parfitt/Edwards, 2002
 "The Oriental" - Rossi/Edwards, 2002 (Heavy Traffic)
 "The Party Ain't Over Yet" - John David, 2005 (The Party Ain't Over Yet)
 "The Winner" - Rossi/Young, 2011 (Quid Pro Quo)
 "Thinking Of You" - Rossi/Young, 2004 (XS All Areas - The Greatest Hits)
 "This Is Me" - Parfitt/Edwards, 2005 (The Party Ain't Over Yet)
 "Tobacco Road" - Loudermilk, 2003 (Riffs)
 "Tongue Tied" - Rossi/Young, 2007 (In Search Of The Fourth Chord)
 "Two Way Traffic" - Rossi/Edwards, 2011 (Quid Pro Quo)
 "Velvet Train" - Edwards/Bown, 2005 (The Party Ain't Over Yet)
 "Wild One" - O'Keefe/Greenan/Owens, 2003 (Riffs)
 "You Let Me Down" - Rossi/Young, 2002
 "You Never Stop" - Rossi/Parfitt/Bown/Edwards/Letley, 2005 (The Party Ain't Over Yet)
 "You'll Come Round" - Rossi/Young, 2004 (XS All Areas - The Greatest Hits)
 "You're The One For Me" - Letley, 2007 (In Search Of The Fourth Chord)

Francis Rossi / Rick Parfitt / Andy Bown / John Edwards / Leon Cave (2013-2016)

 "One for the Road" - Bown, 2016 (Aquostic II – That's a Fact!)
 "One of Everything" - Bown, 2016 (Aquostic II – That's a Fact!)
 "Is Someone Rocking Your Heart?" - Rossi/Young, 2016 (Aquostic II – That's a Fact!)

The only other studio recordings by this line-up are re-recordings on Aquostic – Stripped Bare and Aquostic II – That's a Fact!

Francis Rossi / Richie Malone / Andy Bown / John Edwards / Leon Cave (2016-present)

 "Backbone" - Rossi/Edwards, 2019 (Backbone)
 "Backing Off" - Rossi/Bown, 2019 (Backbone)
 "Better Take Care" - John David, 2019 (Backbone)
 "Crazy, Crazy" - Rossi/Bown, 2019 (Backbone)
 "Cut Me Some Slack" - Rossi/Edwards, 2019 (Backbone)
 "Face the Music" - Malone, 2019 (Backbone)
 "Falling Off the World" - Cave, 2019 (Backbone)
 "Get Out Of My Head" - Malone, 2019 (Backbone)
 "I See You're In Some Trouble" - Rossi/Young, 2019 (Backbone)
 "I Wanna Run Away With You" - Rossi/Young, 2019 (Backbone)
 "Liberty Lane" - Rossi/Edwards, 2019 (Backbone)
 "Running Out of Time" - Rossi/Bown, 2019 (Backbone)
 "Waiting for a Woman" - Rossi/Young, 2019 (Backbone)

References

 
Status Quo
Status Quo